Ramen Ryoma is a Japanese restaurant chain with locations in the United States and Chile. In the U.S., the restaurant operates in the Portland metropolitan area and in San Diego, California.

Description 
Ramen Ryoma is a Japanese restaurant with multiple locations in the United States and Chile. The Beaverton, Oregon restaurant is attached to a Uwajimaya store and serves shio, shoyu, and miso broths, as well as chashu pork, pan-fried pork gyoza, and kurobuta sausage. Ramen Ryoma's menu has also included corn butter miso ramen, spicy umami ramen, Japanese style-curry housemade egg noodles, sushi and  sashimi, takoyaki, and yakitori.

History

Oregon 

Chef and owner Yoshinari Ichise opened the original Ramen Ryoma in Portland in 2016. Plans to open a restaurant on Southwest Morrison Street in downtown Portland were announced in 2021.

California 
The first San Diego location opened in Kearny Mesa in 2018. The restaurant also operates in Pacific Beach (since late 2018) and Hillcrest. The Kearny Mesa location closed in early 2021.

Reception 
Rebekah Gonzalez included the Hillcrest restaurant in iHeart's 2021 list of "Where to Find the Best Ramen in San Diego". In 2022, Krista Garcia and Ron Scott of Eater Portland said Ramen Ryoma is a "worthy [place] to get a Japanese noodle fix in Beaverton". The website's Seiji Nanbu and Janey Wong included the restaurant in a 2022 overview of "Where to Find Knockout Ramen in Portland and Beyond".

See also 

 List of Japanese restaurants

References

External links 

 
 Ramen Ryoma (Beaverton) at Zomato

Culture of San Diego
Japanese restaurants in Oregon
Japanese restaurants in Portland, Oregon
Japanese restaurants in the United States
Japanese-American culture in California
Restaurants in Beaverton, Oregon
Restaurants in California
Southwest Portland, Oregon
Ramen shops